The 7th Asian Cross Country Championships took place 2004 in Pune, India. Team rankings were decided by a combination of each nation's top three athletes finishing positions.

Medalists

Medal table

References
Results

Asian Cross Country Championships
Asian Cross Country
Asian Cross Country
Asian Cross Country
Sport in Pune
International athletics competitions hosted by India